Casaleggio may refer to:

Casaleggio Boiro, Italian municipality of the province of Alessandria
Casaleggio Novara,  Italian municipality of the province of Novara
Gianroberto Casaleggio (1954-2016), Italian entrepreneur and guru of Five Star Movement
Davide Casaleggio (born 1976), Italian entrepreneur, son of Gianroberto